Mikhail Yuryevich Komarov (born 3 April 1984) is a Russian former footballer.

External links
  Player page on the official FC Sportakademklub Moscow website

1984 births
Living people
Russian footballers
FC Khimki players
FC Dynamo Moscow players
Russian Premier League players
FC Sibir Novosibirsk players
Association football goalkeepers
Footballers from Moscow
FC Luch Vladivostok players
FC Volgar Astrakhan players
FC Volga Nizhny Novgorod players
FC Armavir players
FC Neftekhimik Nizhnekamsk players
FC Fakel Voronezh players
FC Sportakademklub Moscow players